The Hermitage, also known as the John Ottis Adams and Winifred Brady Adams Home and Studio, is a historic home located at Brookville, Franklin County, Indiana.  The original house was built about 1835 by well-to-do paper manufacturer James Henry Speer. It was  reconfigured in 1898 by John Ottis Adams and his wife Winifred Brady Adams.

It is a -story, Bungalow / American Craftsman inspired frame dwelling sheathed in clapboard.  A full-width front porch supported by 17 tapered columns. At each end of the house are artist's studios, built for each of the Adamses. A rear section rises to  stories. Also on the property are the levee built after a flood in 1913, contributing gazebo (c. 1910), pergola (c. 1910), and outhouse.

Originally painter J. Ottis Adams (1851-1927) shared the house and studios with another artist. By 1899 he and his wife Winifred Brady Adams, a still-life painter, took over full possession of the property.

The Hermitage was listed on the National Register of Historic Places in 2004.  It is located in the Brookville Historic District.

References

Houses on the National Register of Historic Places in Indiana
Houses completed in 1898
Buildings and structures in Franklin County, Indiana
National Register of Historic Places in Franklin County, Indiana
Historic district contributing properties in Indiana